Chandrakala was an Indian actress who appeared in Telugu, Kannada, Tamil, Malayalam and Hindi films.

Film career
She debuted in Kannada films in 1963 and went on to pair with  Dr. Rajkumar, Kalyan Kumar, Uday Kumar and Rajesh. In 1971, she made her debut in the Tamil movie Praptham opposite Sivaji Ganesan and Srikanth. Her most significant role was in the film Alaigal, directed by C. V. Sridhar. Her other notable films include Kaalangalil Aval Vasantham, Ulagam Sutrum Valiban and Moondru Deivangal (as Sivakumar's co-star). She was better known for her soft roles.

Partial filmography

Tamil
 Praptham (1971) as Gowri - Debut in Tamil
 Moondru Dheivangal (1971) as Lakshmi
 Puguntha Veedu (1972) as Vasanthi
 Alaigal (1973) as Lakshmi
 Deiva Vamsam (1973) as Radha
 Ulagam Sutrum Valiban (1973) as Rathnadevi
 Uravadum Nenjam (1976) 
 Kaalangalil Aval Vasantham (1976) as Kalpana
 Ellam Avale (1977)
 Varuvan Vadivelan (1978)
 Vazhthungal (1978)

Hindi
 Shola Aur Shabnam (1961) as young Sandhya
 Arab Ka Sitara (1961)
 Kala Jadoo (1963)
 Black Arrow (1965)
 Badmaash (1969)
 Return Of Johny (1972)
 Aarambh (1976)

Kannada

 Sri Ramanjaneya Yuddha (1963) as Dancer
 Jeevana Tharanga (1963)
 Jenu Goodu (1963)
 Navakoti Narayana (1964)
 Subba Shastry (1966)
 Parvathi Kalyana (1967)
 Onde Balliya Hoogalu (1967)
 Bedi Bandavalu (1968)
 Rowdy Ranganna (1968)
 Ananda Kanda (1968)
 Punya Purusha (1969)
 Punarjanma (1969)
 Margadarshi (1969)
 Manashanthi (1969)
 Chaduranga (1969)
 Amarabharathi (1971)
 Sankalpa (1973)
 Maga Mommaga (1974)
 Onde Roopa Eradu Guna (1975)
 Mane Belaku (1975)
 Suli (1978)
 Sri Raghavendra Vaibhava (1981)

Telugu

 Sathi Sukanya (1963)
 Aada Paduchu (1967) as Sharada
 Chelleli Kosam (1968)
 Aatmiyulu (1969) as Seetha
 Mathru Devata (1969)
 Thalli Thandrulu (1970)
 Jai Jawan (1970)
 Thalla? Pellama? (1970)
 Sampoorna Ramayanamu (1971)...Sita Devi
 Nammaka Drohulu (1971)
 Dussehra Bullodu (1971) as Nirmala
 Inspector Bharya (1972)
 Maa Inti Velugu (1972)
 Kiladi Bullodu (1972)
 Tata Manavadu (1972) as Suguna
 Kanna Thalli (1972)
 Poolmala (1973)
 Puttinillu Mettinillu (1973)
 Sthree (1973)
 Manuvu Manasu (1973)
 Nomu (1974) as Parvati
 Chakravakam (1974)
 Mugguru Ammayilu (1974)
 Kode Nagu (1974)
 Iddaru Iddare (1976)
 Oka Deepam Veligindhi (1976)
 Kurukshetram (1977) as Rukmini
 Annadammula Savaal (1978)
 Lakshmi Pooja (1979)
 Sri Mantralaya Raghavendra Vaibhavam (1981)

Malayalam
 Ezhuthatha Kadha (1970) as Meena 
 Moonnupookkal (1971)
 Aanandham Paramaanandham (1977) as Rekha
 Aa Nimisham (1977)
 Vayanadan Thamban (1978)
 Aalmaaraattam (1978)

Death
Chandrakala died prematurely of cancer on 21 June 1999, aged 48.

References

External links

Actresses in Tamil cinema
Indian film actresses
1950s births
Year of birth uncertain
1999 deaths
Actresses in Malayalam cinema
Actresses in Kannada cinema
Actresses in Telugu cinema
Actresses in Hindi cinema
20th-century Indian actresses